Irina Khromacheva and Nina Stojanović were the defending champions, but chose not to participate.

Irina Bara and Rebeka Masarova won the title, defeating Andrea Gámiz and Seone Mendez in the final, 6–4, 7–6(7–2).

Seeds

Draw

Draw

References
Main Draw

BBVA Open Ciudad de Valencia - Doubles